Franklin Delano Roosevelt (FDR) Park (originally named League Island Park) is a park located along the Delaware River in the southernmost point of South Philadelphia, Pennsylvania, comprising some  which includes a  golf course (closed and converted to meadows in 2019), about  of buildings, roadways, pathways for walking, landscaped architecture, and a variety of picnic and recreation areas placed within about  of natural lands including ponds and lagoons.

Location

The park is bordered by the South Philadelphia Sports Complex on South Broad Street, Interstate 95/Philadelphia Naval Yard and Pattison Avenue/ Packer Park residential neighborhood. Many Philadelphians enjoy it as a green "oasis" for a variety of recreational activities, while sport and entertainment event patrons attending games and events at the nearby stadium may use it as an alternative place for offsite parking.

History

The park was built to the design of Olmsted Brothers, the firm of Frederick Law Olmsted Jr. and John Charles Olmsted in the early 20th century. The parkland was reclaimed mostly from marshlands of Greenwich Island, one of several islands in the area created by river channels present in the 18th and 19th centuries. The use of the park for the Sesquicentennial Exposition in 1926 and subsequent improvements have moderately changed the original design, keeping the main character of the park west of Broad Street. The original plan of the Olmsted Brothers still remains highly visible and significant west of Broad Street. 

The official name was changed from League Island Park to Franklin Delano Roosevelt Park in 1955.

The park's boathouse (1916), gazebo (1914) and American Swedish Historical Museum (1926) are reminders of the 1926 Exposition. In 2000, the park was added to the Philadelphia Register of Historic Places.

Environment
FDR Park is located on the Atlantic Coastal Plain, a hydrographic province which includes extreme southeastern Pennsylvania and southern New Jersey. The Coastal Plain supports different plants and animals from the adjacent Piedmont of Pennsylvania. Because of the extreme development of the Coastal Plain in Pennsylvania, many of these distinctive plants and animals are rare in the state.

The ponds and lagoons are remnants of the tidal marsh and channel system which originally occupied the area between the Schuylkill and Delaware rivers. Diking, draining and filling of these marshes probably started with the first settlement of the area by the Swedes in the early 17th century, culminating in the installation of a tide gate designed to permit drainage from the park while minimizing  inflow from the Delaware River.

The Pennsylvania Audubon Society has designated the park as an Important Bird Area (IBA). Birds that have natural habitats to watch for in the park are shovelers, gadwall, wigeon, ring-necks, bufflehead, redhead, scaup, ruddys, pintail, pied-billed grebes, snow geese, Canada goose, and herons.

Important Bird Area (IBA)

The National Audubon Society of Pennsylvania has noted that FDR Park is one of the best places in Philadelphia to observe birds. This is because it contains a variety of habitats, including wetlands and waterways. Among bird categories, the park is best known as a place to observe waterfowl, as many various species can be seen there during their migrations.

In addition to mallards and Canada geese, the park attracts large numbers of northern shovelers, gadwall, and American and Eurasian wigeon; redhead, lesser and greater scaup; bufflehead; ruddy ducks; northern pintail; green-winged teal; hooded mergansers; ring-necked ducks, American black ducks, and other rarer duck species. Also seen at the park are pied-billed grebe, double-crested cormorants, American coots and other kinds of non-duck waterfowl. Many other birds may also be seen, from warblers to raptors.

Points of interest

American Swedish Historical Museum
Boat House at Meadow Lake
Gazebo overlooking Meadow Lake (favorite photo spot for brides and grooms)
Bellaire Manor built 1750 by Samuel Preston Provincial Treasurer and trustee of William Penn's estate
Six single-span bridges, built in 1914, with random-coursed schist walls, soldiercourse segmental arches, and soldiercourse coping.

Recreation

Golf course (Closed Oct 31, 2019)
Tennis courts
Soccer field
Richie Ashburn baseball field
Skateboard park under I-95
Children's playgrounds with a child scaled baseball field
Lakeside fishing
Bird watching
Model boat regatta racing at Meadow Lake Boat House

Events
Music Festival: August 1, 1994 the Lollapalooza music festival was held in Philadelphia.
Baseball: Carpenter's Cup Classic annual playoffs between local High School teams with the final game at Citizens Bank Park.
 Philadelphia Flower Show, held at FDR Park in 2021 and 2022.

See also

List of parks in Philadelphia
Marconi Plaza
Sesquicentennial Exposition

References

External links
Friends of FDR Park
A Walking Tour of FDR Park
Year 2000 Historic District Inventory of FDR Park
The Olmsted Brothers' League Island Park
Fairmount Park -FDR Park history highlight
Bellaire Manor Building details for one of the earliest houses found in park system constructed between 1735 and 1750 (Thesis (M.S. in Historic Preservation) -- University of Pennsylvania, 1997)
American Swedish Museum and Cultural Center
League Island Historic District registered by Philadelphia Historical Commission
Retired Judge Reflects on Park History
Video of Park Friends Board Member at Park with Overview of Park
FDR Golf Course
Baseball, Softball and Tennis Facilities
Model Boat Regatta

Municipal parks in Philadelphia
World's fair sites in Pennsylvania
Birdwatching sites in the United States
Philadelphia Register of Historic Places
South Philadelphia
Monuments and memorials to Franklin D. Roosevelt in the United States